Sir Thomas George Fermor-Hesketh, 5th Baronet (11 January 1825 – 20 August 1872) was an English Conservative politician who sat in the House of Commons from 1862 to 1872.

Early life
Hesketh was the only son of Sir Thomas Hesketh, 4th Baronet and his wife Annette Maria Bomford daughter of Robert Bomford of Rakinstown, County Meath. In 1843, he inherited the baronetcy on the death of his father. His paternal grandfather was Sir Thomas Dalrymple Hesketh, 3rd Baronet, who was born in New York City in 1777. The baronetcy had been created for his uncle in 1761 with special remainder to the first Baronet's younger brother Robert, who succeeded him as second Baronet.

He was educated at Christ Church, Oxford.

Career
He was a Deputy Lieutenant and J.P. for Lancashire and Northamptonshire and in 1848 was High Sheriff of Lancashire. He was lieutenant-colonel of the 6th Administrative Battalion of Lancashire Rifle Volunteers and colonel of the 2nd Royal Lancashire Militia (The Duke of Lancaster's Own Rifles).
 
In 1862, Hesketh was elected Member of Parliament for Preston. He held the seat until his death at the age of 47 in 1872.

Personal life

On 10 March 1846, Hesketh married Lady Arabella Fermor at St George's, Hanover Square in London. She was the sister and heiress of George Fermor, 5th Earl of Pomfret, and the daughter of General Thomas Fermor, 4th Earl of Pomfret who fought in the French Revolutionary and Napoleonic Wars and the former Annabel Elizabeth Borough. Together, they were the parents of:

 Edith Elizabeth Fermor-Hesketh (d. 1931), who married Lawrence Rawstorne in 1871.
 Sir Thomas Henry Fermor-Hesketh, 6th Baronet (1847–1876), who died unmarried at age 29.
 Sir Thomas George Fermor-Hesketh, 7th Baronet (1849–1924), who married the American heiress Florence Emily Sharon, a daughter of U.S. Senator William Sharon in 1880.
 Hugh Robert Hesketh (1850–1879)

On the death of his unmarried brother-in-law, George, in 1867, he inherited the 5,000 acre estate of Easton Neston. In 1868, he assumed by royal licence the additional name of Fermor for himself and his second son.

Sir Thomas, who spent his last years improving Easton Neston, died at age 47 on 20 August 1872 at Rufford Hall in Lancashire. he is buried in Rufford Church with his tomb sculpted by Matthew Noble.

References

External links 
 
Miniature Portrait of Sir Thomas George Fermor-Hesketh, 5th Baronet Hesketh of Rufford by G. Williams at the National Trust

1825 births
1872 deaths
Conservative Party (UK) MPs for English constituencies
UK MPs 1859–1865
UK MPs 1865–1868
UK MPs 1868–1874
Alumni of Christ Church, Oxford
High Sheriffs of Lancashire
Lancashire Militia officers
Baronets in the Baronetage of Great Britain